The Seventh constituency for French residents overseas (septième circonscription des Français établis hors de France) is one of eleven constituencies each electing one representative of French citizens overseas to the French National Assembly.

Area
It covers all French citizens living in sixteen countries in Central and Eastern Europe – specifically, Albania, Austria, Bosnia and Herzegovina, Bulgaria, Croatia, the Czech Republic, Germany, Hungary, Kosovo (recognised by France), Macedonia, Montenegro, Poland, Romania, Serbia, Slovenia, and Slovakia. As of New Year's Day 2011, it contained 138,329 registered French voters.  By far the greatest number of these (111,742) were living in Germany. (In contrast, there were only 121 in Albania.)

This constituency elected its first ever representative at the 2012 French legislative election.

Deputies

Election results

2022

 
 
 
 
|-
| colspan="8" bgcolor="#E9E9E9"|
|-

2017

2012

Candidates
The list of candidates was officially finalised on 14 May. There were fifteen candidates:

The Socialist Party chose Pierre-Yves Le Borgn', whose work in the field of solar energy was based in Brussels, but who also worked in Germany, as its candidate. His deputy (suppléante) was Pascale Seux, a resident of Warsaw. Le Borgn' was also endorsed by Europe Écologie–The Greens. (Europe Écologie–The Greens initially chose Pierrette Stephan-Letondor, with Florian Chiron as her deputy (suppléant). A resident of Baden-Württemberg, Stephan-Letondor was a radio-journalist for Südwestrundfunk, and a member of the German party Alliance '90/The Greens. The party subsequently withdrew its candidate, however, as part of an agreement whereby Europe Écologie–The Greens and the Socialist Party endorsed each other's candidate in several constituencies.)

The Union for a Popular Movement chose Ronan Le Gleut. Living in Berlin where he was born in 1976, he served as patent examiner at the European Patent Organisation. Martine Schöppner was his deputy (suppléante).

Éric Bourguignon, of the French Communist Party, was the chosen candidate of the Left Front. His deputy (suppléant) was Michel Cullin.

The Democratic Movement chose Xavier Fourny, with Mathieu Baudier as his deputy.

The National Front did not present a candidate of its own, but endorsed Agnès Dejouy, of the small, new far-right party Sovereignty, Independence and Freedoms, which is allied to the National Front as part of the "Marine blue gathering" (rassemblement bleu Marine). Matthieu Petit is her deputy.

The centre-right Radical Party and the centrist Republican, Ecologist and Social Alliance jointly chose Nicolas Jeanneté, a "cultural entrepreneur" and resident of Germany, as their candidate. Elisabeth Duda was his deputy.

The centre-left Radical Party of the Left chose Sylvie Olympe-Moreau. Her deputy was Jean-Marie Langlet

The centrist green party Cap 21 chose Bruno Pludermacher, a resident of Munich. He was a freelance engineering consultant. His deputy was Odette Barbosa de Lima.

Solidarity and Progress, the French branch of the LaRouche movement, was represented by Elodie Viennot, with Théo Genot as her deputy.

The Liberal Democratic Party chose Denis Matton. He was also endorsed by the Christian Democratic Party. Joël Bros was his deputy.

The Pirate Party chose Isabelle Robin, a teacher, who lived partly in Brittany and partly near Wiesbaden, in Germany. Pointing out that the party had no funds, she campaignrf entirely online, through social media. Julien Hue was her deputy.

Jean-Claude Wambre, a commercial agent established in Nieder-Olm near Mainz, ran as an independent candidate. His deputy was Hervé Messmer.

Jacques Régnier, who had "lived and worked more than half his life" abroad, primarily in Germany, stood as an independent candidate, arguing that expatriates have specific needs best served by an independent. Frédéric Halfort was his deputy.

Hyacinthe Muller, a student of economics and music who had been living almost all his life in Germany, stood as an independent candidate, with Raphaëlle Deliancourt as his deputy.

Jacques Werckmann was an independent candidate, with Clément Renaudet as his deputy.

Results
As in other constituencies, turnout in the first round was low, with a low point of 14.8% in Serbia. Only in Albania did more than half of all registered French citizens vote (59.5%). In Slovakia, turnout was 42.3%; elsewhere, it was below 40%. Socialist candidate Pierre-Yves Le Borgn' finished first by a large margin. He was first in every country except Bulgaria, Kosovo (where he received 3 votes to Ronan Le Gleut's 5), Montenegro (7 votes to Le Gleut's 8), Poland, Romania and Slovakia.

References

7